Aaron Simpson (born 17 June 1999) is an English professional footballer who plays for Folkestone Invicta, as a midfielder.

Early and personal life
Simpson was born in Croydon. Hailing from Rainham, Simpson was given a community award by the Medway African Caribbean Society in January 2018 for his work with schools in the area.

Career
Simpson began his career with  Gillingham, turning professional in the summer of 2017 and moving on loan to Margate in January 2018. He signed a new one-year contract in July 2018.

He was offered a new contract by Gillingham at the end of the 2018–19 season. After rejecting the contract offer, he joined Hythe Town in August 2019.

After 11 league appearances for Hythe, in early 2020 Simpson joined Ramsgate. After 6 league appearances, in September 2020 he then moved to Folkestone Invicta.

References

1999 births
Living people
English footballers
Gillingham F.C. players
Margate F.C. players
Hythe Town F.C. players
Ramsgate F.C. players
Folkestone Invicta F.C. players
Association football midfielders